Depalpur may refer to:

 Depalpur, India, a town in Madhya Pradesh, India
 Depalpur (Vidhan Sabha constituency)
 Depalpur Tehsil, Punjab, Pakistan, whose chief town is Dipalpur
 Dipalpur (also written as Depalpur), a town in Punjab, Pakistan